The Catholic Church is a church in Zalău, Romania.

In 1241 the Roman Catholic Church dedicated to the Holy Cross was demolished during the Mongol invasion of Europe, which was rebuilt in 1246 by Transylvanian bishopric. In 1527 reformation reached Zilah (Zalău) and the Catholic Church lost its property in 1542.

The Protestant domination lasted for 123 years, during which period the Catholic faith stopped to exist in the city. In 1742 András Nagy invited Minorite priests to Zilah, however, they were driven away by Calvinist statesman Miklós Wesselényi. In 1748 there were only 7 Roman Catholic believers in the city. In 1752 a parson was appointed again, and in 1784 the court of Vienna allowed to build a Catholic chapel in Zilah.

The foundation stone of the present church was laid down in 1878, and the constructions, that was carried out by the plans of István Jenei, took 4 years to finish.

References

External links
 Zalău, Catholic church

Religion in Zalău
19th-century Roman Catholic church buildings in Romania
Monuments and memorials in Zalău
Roman Catholic churches completed in 1884
Churches in Sălaj County
Historic monuments in Sălaj County